"We Could" is a song written by Felice Bryant and originally recorded by "Little" Jimmy Dickens in 1955. It's been recorded by numerous acts over the years, including American pop crooner Al Martino, whose version peaked at number 41 on Billboard Hot 100 chart in December 1964, but is best remembered by a version recorded by American country music artist Charley Pride. It was released as the first single from his album Country Feelin'. This version, released nearly ten years after Martino's, peaked at number 3 on the Billboard Hot Country Singles chart. It also reached number 1 on the RPM Country Tracks chart in Canada.

Chart performance

References

1974 singles
Charley Pride songs
RCA Records singles
Songs written by Felice and Boudleaux Bryant
1955 songs